The Thompson River is the largest tributary of the Grand River in the central United States, flowing from southern Iowa into Missouri. In Iowa, it is known simply as the Grand River and passes near the city of Grand River.

It rises in the agricultural lands of Adair County, Iowa, a few miles northeast of Greenfield. The river initially flows east then bends south, passing Macksburg and Davis City and crossing Interstate 35. It then flows into Missouri, where much of its course is channelized. The Weldon River joins at the town of Trenton, the largest settlement along the Thompson River. Below Trenton, the Thompson meanders south for another , joining the Grand River just north of Utica in Livingston County.

See also
List of rivers of Iowa
List of rivers of Missouri

References

Rivers of Iowa
Rivers of Missouri
Tributaries of the Missouri River
Bodies of water of Adair County, Iowa
Bodies of water of Decatur County, Iowa
Bodies of water of Madison County, Iowa
Rivers of Grundy County, Missouri
Rivers of Harrison County, Missouri
Rivers of Livingston County, Missouri